Carex xerantica, the dry sedge, dryland sedge, or white-scaled sedge, is a species of flowering plant in the family Cyperaceae, native to western and central Canada, and the north-central United States. It can be found in a wide variety of habitats, including meadows, prairies, open woodlands, bluffs, sandy or rocky areas, and even talus slopes.

References

xerantica
Flora of Yukon
Flora of Western Canada
Flora of Ontario
Flora of Montana
Flora of Wyoming
Flora of Colorado
Flora of North Dakota
Flora of South Dakota
Flora of Nebraska
Flora of Minnesota
Plants described in 1892
Taxa named by Liberty Hyde Bailey